General elections were held in Malta between 10 and 12 November 1945. The Labour Party was the only party to contest the elections, and won nine of the 10 seats.

Electoral system
The elections were held using the single transferable vote system, whilst suffrage was limited to men meeting certain property qualifications.

Results

References

General elections in Malta
Malta
1945 in Malta
November 1945 events in Europe
1945 elections in the British Empire